Ismar Hairlahović (born 4 March 1996) is a Bosnian professional footballer who plays as a central midfielder.

Club career
Born in Cazin, he joined the youth ranks of the local FK Krajina Cazin, aged 7. Moving up the ranks, he started training with the Bubamara academy from Sarajevo, run by the former Yugoslav international Predrag Pašić, his talent receiving recognition early when he was selected in Bosnia and Herzegovina's selection for his age in 2009. While he was supposed to move to Sarajevo after finishing elementary school, he was scouted by HNK Hajduk Split and moved to Croatia, following in the footsteps of his idol Senijad Ibričić

A regular in the Hajduk youth teams and Bosnia and Herzegovina youth selections, in May 2013 he impressed the new Hajduk first team coach, the former Croatia international Igor Tudor so much he invited him, along with Tonći Mujan to train with the first team squad, not long after his 17th birthday. He would have to wait, however, one more year for his first team debut, coming in the last minutes of the 11.05.2014 4-2 home win against NK Osijek for Chelsea F.C.-bound Mario Pašalić, who was playing his last game in front of Hajduk's home crowd before moving to England.

He later played for FK Zvijezda 09 in the Premier League of Bosnia and Herzegovina.

Honours

Player

Club
Zrinjski Mostar 
Bosnian Premier League: 2017–18

References

External links
 

1996 births
Living people
People from Cazin
Bosniaks of Bosnia and Herzegovina
Association football midfielders
Bosnia and Herzegovina footballers
HNK Hajduk Split players
NK Dugopolje players
FK Sloboda Tuzla players
HŠK Zrinjski Mostar players
FK Radnik Bijeljina players
FK Zvijezda 09 players
NK Međimurje players
FK Zlatibor Čajetina players
Croatian Football League players
Premier League of Bosnia and Herzegovina players
First Football League (Croatia) players
Serbian SuperLiga players
Bosnia and Herzegovina expatriate footballers
Expatriate footballers in Croatia
Bosnia and Herzegovina expatriate sportspeople in Croatia
Expatriate footballers in Serbia
Bosnia and Herzegovina expatriate sportspeople in Serbia